Dosan station is an underground station of Gwangju Metro Line 1 in Dosan-dong, Gwangsan District, Gwangju, South Korea. This is the last underground station for the east before proceed to the ground station name Pyeongdong station.

Station layout

Connections
Dosan station is accessible by buses that plies to Naju.

External links
  Cyber station information from Gwangju Metropolitan Rapid Transit Corporation
  Cyber station information from Gwangju Metropolitan Rapid Transit Corporation

Gwangju Metro stations
Gwangsan District
Railway stations opened in 2008